Monte Negro is a municipality located in the Brazilian state of Rondônia. Its population was 16,007 (2020) and its area is 1,931 km².

References

Municipalities in Rondônia